Tønnes Oksefjell (10 April 1901 - 19 May 1976) was a Norwegian politician for the Liberal Party.

He served as a deputy representative to the Norwegian Parliament from Vest-Agder during the term 1945–1949.

References

1901 births
1976 deaths
Liberal Party (Norway) politicians
Deputy members of the Storting